Alpha Oumar Djalo (born 5 September 1996 in Paris) is a French judoka.

He won a medal at the 2019 World Judo Championships.

References

External links
 
 

1996 births
Living people
French male judoka
Sportspeople from Paris
Competitors at the 2018 Mediterranean Games
21st-century French people